Eubrianax is a genus of water penny beetles in the family Psephenidae. There are about 12 described species in Eubrianax.

Species
These 12 species belong to the genus Eubrianax:

 Eubrianax edwardsii (LeConte, 1874)
 Eubrianax granicollis Lewis, 1895
 Eubrianax illiesi Sato
 Eubrianax manakikikuse Sato, 1964
 Eubrianax meridianus Lee, Sato & Yang, 1999
 Eubrianax niger Lee & Yang, 1990
 Eubrianax nobuoi Sato, 1965
 Eubrianax pellucidus Lewis, 1895
 Eubrianax ramicornis Kiesenwetter, 1874
 Eubrianax secretus (Lee, Sato & Yang, 1999)
 Eubrianax serratus Lee, Yang & Sato, 2001
 Eubrianax tarokoensis Lee & Yang, 1990

References

Further reading

 
 

Byrrhoidea
Articles created by Qbugbot